The Shelley Memorial Award of the Poetry Society of America, was established by the will of Mary P. Sears, and named after the poet Percy Bysshe Shelley. The prize is given to a living American poet selected with reference to genius and need, and is currently worth (2014) between $6,000 and $9,000. The selection is made by a jury of three poets: one each appointed by the presidents of Radcliffe and Berkeley, and the third by the Board of Governors of the Society.

Winners
Winners of the Shelley Memorial Prize:
2022 — Joyelle McSweeney
2021 — Arthur Sze
2020 — Rick Barot 
2019 — Carl R. Martin 
2018 — Ntozake Shange 
2017 — Gillian Conoley 
2016 — Sonia Sanchez 
2015 — D. A. Powell
2014 — Bernadette Mayer
2013 — Martín Espada / Lucia Perillo
2012 — Wanda Coleman
2011 — Rigoberto González / Joan Larkin
2010 — Kenneth Irby / Eileen Myles
2009 — Ron Padgett / Gary Young
2008 — Ed Roberson
2007 — Kimiko Hahn
2006 — George Stanley 
2005 — Lyn Hejinian
2004 — Yusef Komunyakaa
2003 — James McMichael
2002 — Angela Jackson / Marie Ponsot
2001 — Alice Notley / Michael Palmer
2000 — Jean Valentine
1999 — Tom Sleigh
1998 — Eleanor Ross Taylor
1997 — Frank Bidart
1996 — Robert Pinsky / Anne Waldman
1995 — Stanley Kunitz
1994 — Cathy Song / Kenneth Koch
1993 — Josephine Jacobsen
1992 — Lucille Clifton
1991 — Shirley Kaufman
1990 — Thom Gunn
1989 — Thomas McGrath / Theodore Weiss
1988 — Dennis Schmitz
1987 — Mona Van Duyn
1986 — Gary Snyder
1985 — Etheridge Knight
1984 — Robert Duncan / Denise Levertov
1983 — Jon Anderson / Leo Connellan
1982 — Alan Dugan
1981 — Robert Creeley
1980 — Julia Randall
1979 — Hayden Carruth
1978 — Jane Cooper / William Everson
1977 — Muriel Rukeyser
1976 — Gwendolyn Brooks
1975 — Edward Field
1974 — W. S. Merwin
1973 — John Ashbery / Richard Wilbur
1972 — Galway Kinnell
1971 — Louise Townsend Nicholl / Adrienne Rich
1970 — X. J. Kennedy / Mary Oliver
1969 — Ann Stanford
1968 — May Swenson
1967 — Anne Sexton
1966 — David Ignatow
1965 — Ruth Stone
1964 — William Stafford
1963 — Eric Barker
1962 — Theodore Roethke
1961 — Robinson Jeffers
1960 — Delmore Schwartz
1959 — Jose Garcia Villa
1958 — Kenneth Rexroth
1957 — George Abbe
1956 — Robert Fitzgerald
1955 — Léonie Adams
1954 — Kenneth Patchen
1953 — Elizabeth Bishop
1952 — Richard Eberhart
1951 — Jeremy Ingalls
1950 — Louis Kent
1949 — John Berryman
1948 — Janet Lewis
1947 — Rolfe Humphries
1946 — Karl Shapiro
1945 — E. E. Cummings
1944 — Edgar Lee Masters
1943 — Robert Penn Warren
1942 — Ridgely Torrence
1941 — Marianne Moore
1940 — Herbert Bruncken / Winfield T. Scott
1939 — Harry Brown / Robert Francis
1938 — Lincoln Fitzell
1937 — Ben Belitt / Charlotte Wilder
1936 — Josephine Miles
1935 — Lola Ridge / Marya Zaturenska
1934 — Frances Frost / Lola Ridge
1932 — Archibald MacLeish
1931 — Lizette Woodworth Reese
1930 — Conrad Aiken

See also
American poetry
List of poetry awards
List of literary awards
List of years in poetry
List of years in literature

References

American poetry awards